Events from the year 1959 in art.

Events
 June 10 – National Museum of Western Art established in Tokyo.
 André Breton asks Salvador Dalí, Joan Miró, Enrique Tábara and Eugenio Granell to represent Spain by exhibiting some of their works in the Homage to Surrealism Exhibition celebrating the fortieth anniversary of Surrealism.

Awards
 Archibald Prize: William Dobell – Dr Edward MacMahon
 John Moores Painting Prize - Patrick Heron for "Black Painting - Red, Brown and Olive : July 1959"
 Knighthood (United Kingdom): Stanley Spencer

Works

 Milton Avery – Tangerine Moon and Wine Dark Sea
 José de Creeft – Alice in Wonderland 
 Salvador Dalí – The Discovery of America by Christopher Columbus
 Ivan Generalić – The Deer Wedding
 Allan Gwynne-Jones – Lord Beveridge in his 80th year
 Barbara Hepworth – Figure (Archaean) (bronze, 7 casts)
 Asger Jorn – Solvejg
 Alex Katz - Double Portrait of Robert Rauschenberg
 Franz Kline – Orange and Black Wall
 Lee Krasner – Cool White
 Peter Lanyon – Lost Mine
 Georg J. Lober – Statue of George M. Cohan (bronze)
 Elmer Petersen – "World's Largest Buffalo" in Jamestown, North Dakota
 Pablo Picasso – Le déjeuner sur l'herbe
 Nikolai Pozdneev – Spring Day
 Ad Reinhardt – Abstract Painting Diptych
 Stanley Spencer – Self-portrait

Publications
 John Golding – Cubism: a history and an analysis, 1907-1914

Births
 June 2 – Rineke Dijkstra, Dutch photographer
 November 11 – Celia Paul, British painter known for self-portraits
 Willie Doherty, Northern Irish visual artist
 Caio Fonseca, American painter
 Peter Lik, Australian-born landscape photographer

Deaths
 January – Eva Frankfurther, German-born British portrait painter, suicide (born 1930)
 January 29 – Winifred Brunton, South African painter and illustrator (born 1880)
 February 26 – Gabrielle Renard, French artist's model (born 1878)
 February 28 – Beatrix Farrand, American landscape architect (born 1872)
 April 9 – Frank Lloyd Wright, American architectural pioneer (born 1867)
 May 3 – Renato Birolli, Italian painter (born 1905)
 June 8 – Pietro Canonica, Italian sculptor (born 1869)
 July 6 – George Grosz, German painter, draftsman and caricaturist (born 1893)
 July 17 – Sir Alfred Munnings, English equine painter (born 1878)
 August 5 – Frank Godwin, American illustrator (born 1889)
 August 19 – Sir Jacob Epstein, American-born British sculptor (born 1880)
 August 20 – Alfred Kubin, Austrian illustrator (born 1877)
 August 27 – Tom Purvis, English poster artist (born 1888).
 September 9
 Merric Boyd, Australian painter, sculptor and ceramic artist (born 1888)
 Cathleen Mann, English portrait painter and costume designer (born 1896)
 September 13 – Adrian (Greenberg), Hollywood costume designer (born 1903)
 September 18
 Benjamin Péret, French poet, Dadaist and editor of La Révolution surréaliste (born 1899)
 Adolf Ziegler, German painter and politician (born 1892)
 September 29 – Matthew Smith, English painter (born 1879)
 October 6 – Bernard Berenson, Lithuanian American art historian (born 1865)
 November 15 – Charles Jones, English gardener and photographer (born 1866)
 November 18 – Arkady Shaikhet, Soviet documentary photographer (born 1898)
 November 24 – Stepan Erzia, Mordvin sculptor (born 1876)
 December 9 – Gene Carr, American cartoonist (born 1881)
 December 14
 Lizzy Ansingh, Dutch painter (born 1875)
 Sir Stanley Spencer, English painter (born 1891)

See also
 1959 in fine arts of the Soviet Union

References

 
Years of the 20th century in art
1950s in art

ru:1959 год в истории изобразительного искусства СССР